James Peggs (1793–1850) was an English Baptist missionary and pamphleteer active in British India who played an influential role in the spread of Christianity on the subcontinent. Along with fellow General Baptist William Bampton, Peggs spent the majority of his career in India, preaching in Cuttack, Orissa to evangelize the local population. In his pamphlets, Peggs publicised the practise of Sati- then widespread in Bengal to gather support for further evangelical missionary work among the "pagan" Indian public. Peggs also circulated the Pilgrim tax levied on Idolaters going on pilgrimages.

Biography

James Peggs, a student of G.B. Academy at Wisbeach, offered himself to the General Baptist Missionary Society, for missionary service in 1820. With delay in prior designed plans to travel India for missionary service along with William Ward, one of the Serampore Trio, he moved to London in 1820 and obtained acquaintance with British system of education along with Mrs. Bampton, while Bampton acquired some knowledge in Medicine. He was ordained on 15 May 1821 at Loughborough along with Bampton, attended by William Ward too in the service, and sailed to India on 29 May 1821 along with Ward, Bampton, fellow-missionary, and their wives.

Missionary work

Peggs, Bampton, and their wives reached Serampore on 15 November 1821 via Madras(present Chennai). They embarked at Calcutta(present Kolkata) and arrived at mission station at Cuttack on 12 February 1822—With restrictions on missionary work removed in India in 1813, the first batch of Baptist missionaries arrived in 
Orissa on 12 February 1822.. Prior to, departing Calcutta, they received religious tracts, thousands of copies of gospel, epistles, and considerable copies of the sacred writings for distribution among the natives as part of evangelism—These are printed at Serampore mission printing press, under the guidance of Serampore Trio.

Peggs, soon after arrival at the mission station at Cuttack made an excursion to the surrounding areas of Cuttack for a few days to become acquainted with area. While travelling, they distributed books, tracts and scriptures. He made journeys to the surrounding areas of Cuttack along with fellow missionaries to establish four village schools, within a vicinity of 50 miles of the mission station. They initially endeavoured to establish schools under the charge of  masters, until Christian teachers could be obtained through conversion or baptism.

On 1 June 1822, he and Bampton started a vernacular school at Cuttack to impart elementary knowledge of Christian theology through the medium of native Odia language. Between June 1822 and December 1833, fifteen such schools were established by General Baptists Missionary Society, out of which three were in close proximity to Cuttack mission station. By 1844, four village schools were established by Peggs and Charles Lacey around Cuttack. In October 1823, the first Anglo-Indian vernacular school was opened by the Baptist mission at Cuttack.

In a letter to a friend on 5 October 1822, Peggs writes as:

Initially, William Bampton and Peggs worked at Cuttack mission station; later, in 1823, Bampton and his wife left to Puri to start a new mission station over there, while Peggs and his wife continued to work at Cuttack. Later, Peggs along with fellow missionaries like Charles Lacey made several visits to Puri station where Bampton was working for evangelism activities.

He went back to England on 18 May 1825 due to sickness, but kept on speaking on behalf of East India Company and Missionaries, the need to evangelize the Oriya speaking people on name of raising their standard of living and bring them out of superstitions and blind beliefs. After he left Cuttack, Charles Lacey took over his activities at the mission station and kept himself in constant touch with Peggs passing over the day-to-day affairs.

Evangelism

On June 24, 1806, Claudius Buchanan, Vice-Provost of the College of Fort William, having visited Oriya speaking tracts, dreamt and foresaw to turn the entire land of Oriya-speaking districts into Christ land; accordingly, after returning to England, he influenced the public opinion in favour of organised missionary activity in Orissa. East India Company brought all the tracts of Oriya districts under its control by 1822. Around the same time, William Bampton and James Peggs were sent to Orissa with the specific purpose of spreading Christianity among the Oriyas. Prior to that, by 1813, the British parliament through legislation, had allowed the missionaries to undertake educational activity in Company territory. As a result, the missionary societies formed in Britain sent their representatives to various parts of India—after William Bampton in 1822, Charles Lacey came to Orissa in 1823, Amos Sutton in 1825, and Nois and Jeremiah Phillips in 1835.

The evangelical movement in Britain, by the end of 1700, argued that one's commitment to Christ should be reflected in action, primarily to proselytize or seek converts among heathen and abolish slavery in the British empire. Initially, English East India Company had prohibited Christian missionaries from living within their territories and seeking Indian converts in order to prevent unrest or opposition to the Company's trade and political control. In 1813, when the British parliament was considering the renewal of the charter that authorized Company's trade and political control in India, Members of Parliament who were evangelical Christians, especially Methodists and Baptists, induced[forced] the Company to permit missionaries to settle in their territory. Once in India, Protestant missionaries[denominations and groups], namely, General Baptists Mission Society; American Free Will Baptists; Particular Baptist Missionary Society; Evangelical Missionary Society; and German Evangelical Lutheran Missionaries; and alike, criticized native religious practices such as idolatry, and social customs such as early marriage and sati, especially in Bengal and Orissa, as superstitious and barbaric.

The first activities of the missionary, like starting a chapel at Cuttack, evoked little response and appreciation from the Hindus. Among the important contributions of the Christian missionaries in Orissa was the spread of modern education. The missionaries, in fact, laid the foundation and were the pioneers of present modern education in Orissa. Missionaries considered education "as auxiliary to preaching". Their aim was to evangelize the entire country and they believed that by the spread of education, superstitions, beliefs, blind faiths, and idolatry could be erased from the native mind and thereof the circulation of sacred scriptures would be feasible. Indirectly, took education as a tool for gradual destruction of Hinduism and replace it with Christian religion.

Missionaries like Peggs were sent to Orissa to undertake educational activity in East India Company territory and also to spread Christianity among the Odias. As part of evangelism and conversion of Odia people, he and William Bampton distributed a thousand copies of Gospel translated into the Odia language who gather at the annual gathering of Juggernaut car-festival in 1823. He published several pamphlets on the miseries of Sati, Pilgrim Tax, Ghaut Murder, Infanticide, and Slavery.

Peggs, lately returned from Orissa, attended the Annual Meeting of the Baptist Missionary Society, held at Great Queen Street Chapel, on 22 June to give the following appalling view at Juggernaut:

While in England, having returned from Orissa, James Peggs published the book India’s Cries to British Humanity, Relative to Infanticide, British Connection with Idolatry, Ghau Murders, Suttee, Slavery, and Colonization in India in 1832, when British parliament was reviewing the charter of the Company. He also sought to induce Parliament to give firm instructions to the Company to exert greater control over Hindu social customs and religious practices that he considered evil and barbaric. Peggs also claimed that "self-immolation" continued among Hindu widows, and that the Company must take more vigorous measures to enforce the prohibition of sati. The image (Burning a Hindoo widow), the first page of Pegg's compendium of sources and commentary on "Suttees" [Sati] in India’s Cries to British Humanity, Relative to Infanticide, British Connection with Idolatry, Ghau Murders, Suttee, Slavery, and Colonization in India, was frequently reproduced again and again as ritual of sati, to influence Britons and whereby British parliament to garner support for enforcing prohibition of sati as a ladder for extending Charter extension for Company's reign and also Missionaries Translational activism.

Translational activism
Missionary translation was divided into two categories: one, secular texts—translated texts of Indian literature, textbooks for school curricula, government regulations and circulars; two, religious texts—translations of English and Bengali tracts, Christian literary allegories, and the translation of gospel and Bible. James Peggs initially, Amos Sutton and others later, started their education mission by writing secular texts such as dictionaries and grammars—the volume of writing was so large that it necessitated a separate printing press at Cuttack in 1837; however, prior to Cuttack printing press, translation activities were performed and published from Serampore Mission press. Missionaries were installed by East India Company as mediators between Company administrators and native Oriyas. Over the period, missionaries instead of becoming a mediator between two languages and cultures, assumed and become an instrument of hegemony between the State and Church; partly, because of using incompetent translators, lack of adequate training, or using Bengali as intermediary language for translation into Odia language—finally, under the guise of Secular texts and School textbooks, the missionaries were able to spread their sphere of activism – to the extent of using them as the tools of warfare against the ignorants and native heathens, including success in conversion of heathens to some extent -, undermining the Company administration's secular character.

Works
 Suttees' Cry to Britain, in 1828.
 India’s Cries to British Humanity, Relative to Infanticide, British Connection with Idolatry, Ghau Murders, Suttee, Slavery, and Colonization in India, in 1832.
 History of the General Baptist Mission, in 1846.
 A brief Sketch of the Rise and Progress of Cuttack, in 1854.
 The Present state of East India slavery, chiefly derived from the Parliamentary Papers on the subject.
 Orissa: Its Geography, Statistics, History, Religion and Antiquities.

See also
 The British missionary societies
 Evangelical Missionary Alliance
 Evangelical Church in Germany
 Christian literature

References

External links
 Missionary Position: The Irony of Translational Activism in Colonial Orissa
  ORISSA in the CROSSFIRE
 Early Christian Missionaries and the Car Festival
 Missionary register, Volume 14 - Author: Church Missionary Society

1793 births
1850 deaths
English Baptist missionaries
Baptist missionaries in India
19th-century English Baptist ministers